Sandra Caldarone (born 15 October 1972), better known as Sandra Kim, is a Belgian singer of Italian descent who won the Eurovision Song Contest 1986. Her father was an Italian immigrant from Torrebruna in the Province of Chieti in the Abruzzo region of Italy.

At the time of her Eurovision win, she was only 13 years old, making her the youngest winner of the contest, even though the lyrics of her song "J'aime la vie" ("I love life") claim her to be 15; the Swiss petitioned to have the song disqualified after her real age was revealed. This petition ended up failing and Kim went on to win that year's Eurovision Song Contest. Kim also represented Belgium at the Yamaha Music Festival in Tokyo during the autumn of 1986 and sang the title song for the French animated television series Il était une fois... la vie. Kim's pop rock album Make Up was released on 12 May 2011, containing songs written by famous Belgian artists like Salvatore Adamo, Dani Klein (Vaya Con Dios), Ozark Henry, Anthony Sinatra (Piano Club), Jacques Duval and David Bartholomé (Sharko). She also won the first season of the Belgian version of The Masked Singer as “Queen”.

Early life
Kim was born in Montegnée, near Liège to a hairdresser mother and accordionist father, and started singing when she was seven.

Personal life
In 1994, Kim married Olivier Gerard. They divorced a year later. She has been married to Jurgen Delanghe since 2001.

Discography

Albums 
J'aime la vie (1986, French)
Bien dans ma peau (1988, French)
Balance tout (1991, French) / Met open ogen (1991, Dutch)
Les Sixties (1993, French) / Sixties (1993, Dutch)
Onvergetelijk (1997, Dutch)
Heel diep in mijn hart (1998, Dutch, 2-track single)
Make Up (2011, English and French)

Singles (some) 
"Tokyo Boy" (French)
"Bel me, schrijf me" (duet with Flemish singer Luc Steeno, Dutch)
"Anyway the Wind Blows" (2010, English)
"Who Are You (07/11/2020, English)
"AMI AMI

References

External links
  (Dutch, French)
 Website about Sandra Kim's discography (French - Dutch - English)

1972 births
Living people
People from Saint-Nicolas, Liège
Belgian people of Italian descent
Eurovision Song Contest winners
Masked Singer winners
Eurovision Song Contest entrants for Belgium
Eurovision Song Contest entrants of 1986
French-language singers of Belgium
Dutch-language singers of Belgium
Belgian child singers
21st-century Belgian women singers
21st-century Belgian singers